Type 94 may refer to:
 Type 94 tankette
 Type 94 8 mm Pistol
 Type 94 37 mm Anti-Tank Gun
 Type 94 75 mm Mountain Gun
 Type 94 90 mm Infantry Mortar
 Type 94 Disinfecting Vehicle and Type 94 Gas Scattering Vehicle
 40 cm/45 Type 94 naval gun
 Type 094 submarine